Heart Dorset (formerly 2CR – Two Counties Radio) was a British Independent Local Radio station, broadcast from studios at a former branch of MFI on Southcote Road in Bournemouth. Its original name was derived from the fact that its broadcast area included parts of the counties of Dorset and Hampshire. The station was merged with Heart Hampshire in July 2010 to form the regional station Heart South Coast.

History

Former BBC Radio Solent presenter John Piper launched the station in 1980, with the words Good Morning Hampshire, Good Morning Dorset. At that time, 2CR consisted of a full service station with music, personalities, phone-ins, and a local news service. Managing Director for the first three years, was Norman Bilton who joined them from Metro Radio in Newcastle. The station's longest serving staff member was office manager Rosemary Mundy, who worked for the station from its launch until 2009.

The station gained its highest RAJAR listening figures at the turn of the millennium with a successful daytime line-up consisting of The Morning Crew (Richie, Martyn & Emma), Katherine Orman from 10am to 2pm and Adrian Clarkson from 2 to 7pm. Clarkson was replaced by GWR network presenter Rob Smith in 2002 and Orman left shortly afterwards to be replaced by James Lloyd from Fire Radio.

Network restructuring
On 21 June 2010, Global Radio announced plans to close Heart Dorset and merge the station with Heart Hampshire as part of plans to reduce the Heart network of stations from 33 to 16. The new station, Heart South Coast, began from Fareham on 30 July 2010.

Notable past presenters

Seán Street
Fran Godfrey
Martyn Lee
Bam Bam
Charlie Wolf
Christian O'Connell
Dan O'Hagan

References 

Companies based in Bournemouth
Radio stations established in 1980
Radio stations in Hampshire
Radio stations in Dorset
Dorset
Defunct radio stations in the United Kingdom